Jessica Thorn (born 16 December 1981) is a Finnish footballer who played as a midfielder. Thorne represented the Finnish women's national football team, 33 times and scored 1 goal. Thorn was also part of the Finnish team at the 2005 European Championships.
Since retiring from football, Lagerblom now works as a physiotherapist and football commentator for Yle Urheilu.

References

1981 births
People from Kaarina
Living people
Finnish women's footballers
Finland women's international footballers
Women's association football midfielders
Helsingin Jalkapalloklubi (women) players